Frances Louise Josephy (February 1900 – 1985) was a British Liberal politician, journalist and lecturer.

Background
She was born in Broughty Ferry, Forfarshire. She was educated at Seymour Lodge School, Dundee, before going on to St. Andrews University and Newnham College, Cambridge. She graduated from Cambridge with a degree in Classics and English.

Political career
In 1924, she joined the National League of Young Liberals. She was Research Secretary to the Radical Parliamentary Group in the House of Commons. In March 1928 she stood at the London County Council elections as a Liberal candidate for St. Marylebone alongside Harcourt Johnstone. They trailed both Municipal Reform and Labour candidates. In February 1929 she was selected as prospective Liberal candidate for Winchester for the general election. She contested Winchester in 1929. This was a safe Tory seat that they had won at every election since 1885 and at the previous election, the Liberals came third. She managed to increase the Liberal vote but still finished third. During the 1929-31 parliament she was a regular attendee of debates in both houses. She was a regular contributor to 'The Forward View' the monthly journal of the National League of Young Liberals. Her column entitled 'Seen From The Gallery' reported on the role the Liberal were playing in a parliament where they held the balance of power.

In October 1930 she was the prospective Liberal candidate for Winchester for the general election. However the prospective Liberal candidate for Basingstoke withdrew just before the 1931 election. As Basingstoke was regarded as a better prospect, she switched constituencies. She contested Basingstoke in 1931, a seat the Liberals had won in 1923. In an unfavourable year for the Liberals, she retained second place.

She became Honorary Secretary of the National League of Young Liberals, and a vice-chairman. In October 1933 she was still the prospective Liberal candidate for Basingstoke. However, a vacancy occurred in the more winnable division of Devizes and by October 1935 she had been adopted there. She contested Devizes in 1935, a seat the Liberals last won in 1923 and nearly re-gained in 1929. She managed to reduce the Tory majority.

She was re-adopted by Devizes Liberals as their prospective parliamentary candidate for a General Election expected to occur in 1939/40. In 1938-39 she served as Chairman of the National League of Young Liberals. In 1938 she advocated that all countries colonies should be handed over to the League of Nationa and run through a colonial service as a first step on a path to independence. In May 1939 she condemned the Chamberlain Government's betrayal of the democracies of Spain and Czechoslovakia. In 1939 she became President of the National League of Young Liberals, serving through the Second world War. In the early 1940s, she was an advocate of global federalism. She served as Chairman of the Federal Union from 1941–45. She edited the group's paper, Federal News, from 1944–6. She contested Devizes again in 1945. With the country swinging to Labour, she dropped to third place.

Josephy was an advocate of both European and World Federalism. In 1947 at the first World Federalism Congress, she said, “Being British, I am not particularly interested in theory and not at all in philosophy,” and noted that if world government did not happen soon, it never would. She later worked at the Assembly of the Western European Union, which existed to develop a common defence policy for Europe. She was also a member of the European Union of Federalists' central committee from 1946 until her death. In 1949 she attended the European Assembly at Strasbourg as an observer. She was a member of the Liberal party national executive. She contested Cambridge in 1950. This was not a good prospect for the Liberals as they had not contested the seat since 1934 and had not won since 1906. 

She contested Cambridge again in 1951.

From the mid-1950s, she worked as a reviser for the Assembly of Western European Union in Paris for nine years.

Electoral record

External links
1929 Josephy Election Leaflet: http://www.gophoto.it/view.php?i=http://lib-1.lse.ac.uk/archivesblog/wp-content/uploads/2011/03/Josephy_leaflet1.jpg#.UmPBjxDOS2Y
Catalogue of the Frances Josephy papers held at LSE Archives

References

1900 births
1984 deaths
Alumni of Newnham College, Cambridge
Politicians from Dundee
Scottish politicians
Alumni of the University of St Andrews
Liberal Party (UK) parliamentary candidates
People from Broughty Ferry